Rajahmundry revenue division, officially known as Rajamahendravaram revenue division, is an administrative division in the East Godavari district of the Indian state of Andhra Pradesh. It is one of the 2 revenue divisions in the district which consists of 10 mandals under its administration. Rajahmundry city is the divisional headquarters.

Administration 
There are 10 mandals in Rajamahendravaram revenue division.

See also 
List of revenue divisions in Andhra Pradesh
List of mandals in Andhra Pradesh

References 

Revenue divisions in East Godavari district